Michael Vanthourenhout (born 10 December 1993) is a Belgian cyclo-cross and road cyclist, who currently rides for UCI Continental team . He represented his nation in the men's elite event at the 2016 UCI Cyclo-cross World Championships in Heusden-Zolder.

He is the brother of racing cyclist Dieter Vanthourenhout. In August 2021 Michael Vanthourenhout married Kelly Van den Steen

Major results

2010–2011
 Junior Superprestige
2nd Ruddervoorde
 2nd Junior Aigle
 Junior Fidea Classics
3rd Tervuren
2011–2012
 Under-23 Gazet van Antwerpen
1st Ronse
 UCI Under-23 World Cup
3rd Liévin
2012–2013
 Under-23 Superprestige
1st Middelkerke
 1st Kalmthout
 3rd Overall Under-23 Bpost Bank Trophy
1st Ronse
1st Koppenberg
2nd Hasselt
 UCI Under-23 World Cup
3rd Plzeň
2013–2014
 1st  UEC European Under-23 Championships
 UCI Under-23 World Cup
1st Cauberg
3rd Nommay
 Under-23 Superprestige
2nd Ruddervoorde
2nd Middelkerke
3rd Hoogstraten
 2nd  UCI World Under-23 Championships
 2nd Eeklo
 Under-23 Bpost Bank Trophy
3rd Baal
2014–2015
 1st  UCI World Under-23 Championships
 1st  Overall UCI Under-23 World Cup
1st Cauberg
2nd Hoogerheide
 1st Overall Under-23 Superprestige
1st Diegem
2nd Zonhoven
2nd Ruddervoorde
2nd Gavere
2nd Spa-Francorchamps
2nd Hoogstraten
2nd Middelkerke
 1st Ardooie
 2nd Overall Under-23 Bpost Bank Trophy
1st Ronse
1st Koppenberg
2nd Hamme
2nd Essen
3rd Hasselt
3rd Baal
3rd Lille
 2nd Otegem
 3rd Eeklo
2015–2016
 1st Maldegem
 2nd Erpe-Mere
 2nd Versluys
 2nd Otegem
 2nd Contern
 UCI World Cup
3rd Las Vegas
 Bpost Bank Trophy
3rd Essen
 EKZ CrossTour
3rd Eschenbach
 3rd Eeklo
2016–2017
 Brico Cross
1st Kruibeke
2nd Maldegem
2nd Geraardsbergen
 1st Contern
 UCI World Cup
2nd Las Vegas
3rd Hoogerheide
 DVV Trophy
3rd Ronse
3rd Baal
 Soudal Classics
3rd Neerpelt
 3rd Zonnebeke
2017–2018
 2nd  UCI World Championships
 Brico Cross
2nd Meulebeke
3rd Eeklo
 UCI World Cup
3rd Hoogerheide
 Superprestige
3rd Middelkerke
 DVV Trophy
3rd Hamme
 Soudal Classics
3rd Leuven
3rd Waregem
2018–2019
 UCI World Cup
2nd Tábor
3rd Iowa City
3rd Pontchâteau
 3rd Overall DVV Trophy
2nd Koppenberg
2nd Lille
3rd Brussels
 Superprestige
2nd Diegem
2nd Middelkerke
 Brico Cross
2nd Maldegem
3rd Ronse
 2nd Overijse
 2nd Wachtebeke
 3rd National Championships
2019–2020
 Ethias Cross
1st Meulebeke
2nd Maldegem
 2nd Gullegem
 UCI World Cup
3rd Waterloo
3rd Bern
 Superprestige
3rd Diegem
 2nd Overall DVV Trophy
3rd Koppenberg
 3rd Oostmalle
2020–2021
 EKZ CrossTour
1st Bern
 2nd  UEC European Championships
 3rd National Championships
 3rd Overall UCI World Cup
1st Tábor
 3rd Overall Superprestige
1st Merksplas
2nd Boom
2nd Middelkerke
 3rd Overall X²O Badkamers Trophy
2nd Lille
3rd Herentals
 Ethias Cross
3rd Bredene
3rd Sint-Niklaas
2021–2022
 2nd Overall UCI World Cup
1st Namur
2nd Waterloo
2nd Overijse
2nd Val di Sole
3rd Fayetteville
3rd Iowa City
3rd Rucphen
3rd Flamanville
 3rd Overall X²O Badkamers Trophy
1st Brussels
2nd Loenhout
 Ethias Cross
1st Meulebeke
1st Sint-Niklaas
3rd Lokeren
3rd Bredene
 3rd  UEC European Championships
2022–2023
 1st  UEC European Championships
 1st  National Championships
 2nd Overall UCI World Cup
1st Overijse
1st Val di Sole
3rd Fayetteville
3rd Tábor
3rd Antwerpen
 Exact Cross
1st Kruibeke
1st Meulebeke
2nd Beringen
 1st Maldegem
 3rd Overall X²O Badkamers Trophy
2nd Baal
2nd Brussels
3rd Koppenberg
3rd Hamme
 3rd Overall Superprestige
3rd Niel
3rd Merksplas
3rd Gullegem

References

External links
 
 

1993 births
Living people
Cyclo-cross cyclists
Belgian male cyclists
Belgian cyclo-cross champions
Sportspeople from Bruges
Cyclists from West Flanders
21st-century Belgian people